The Titan mine is one of the largest titanium mines in Canada. It is located in Ontario, and has reserves amounting to 49 million tonnes of ore grading 14.8% titanium and 0.24% vanadium.

See also 
 List of mines in Canada

References 

Titanium mines in Canada